Patricia O'Connor (born November 11, 1941) in Coventry (UK) was the captain of the first Australia women's national soccer team in the mid-1970s.
O'Connor was also captain of the St George Budapest Women's Football team which, at that time, had been unbeaten in competitive games in the NSW Women's Soccer competition.

O'Connor, along with her husband Patrick O'Connor, was a central figure in the organisation and running of the first Sydney-wide women's soccer league and the initial inter-state women's soccer state championships.

O'Connor was also captain of the NSW Women's Soccer representative team during the mid-1970s and captain of the Western Australia Women's Soccer team in 1978.

She captained the first Matildas' team who played in the first Asian Cup in 1975 in Hong Kong. She was capped four times for Australia and had the distinction of scoring the first official goal for the Matildas when she netted in a 3–2 loss to Thailand in the first game of that Asian Cup.

References

Year of death missing
Australian women's soccer players
Women's association footballers not categorized by position
1941 births
Footballers from Coventry
Australia women's international soccer players
Soccer players from Sydney
Sportswomen from New South Wales